Drakula halála is a silent film that was co-written and directed by Károly Lajthay. The film was the first appearance of Count Dracula from Bram Stoker's novel Dracula (1897), though the film does not follow the plot of the novel.

Plot
A woman experiences frightening visions after being admitted to an insane asylum, where one of the inmates claims to be Drakula. She has trouble determining whether the inmate's visions are real or merely nightmares.

Cast

Production
The Hungarian trade publication Képes Mozivilág wrote in 1921, where it was announced as translating the "basic ideas" of Stoker's Dracula (1897). Stoker's book was first published as a serial in Budapesti Hírlap and later published in Hungary as a novel.According to censorship records, the Lapa Film Studio produced Drakula halála. The director of the film was Károly Lajthay, whose film career consisted mostly of directing and acting.  Lajthay visited Budapest in order to rent space at Corvin Film Studio for a film with the working title of Drakula.  The film was written by Lajthay and Mihály Kertész who had was also a prominent film director in Budapest and became better known as using the name Michael Curtiz, the director of American productions such as Doctor X (1932), Mystery of the Wax Museum (1933) and Casablanca (1942).

Among the crew was Eduard Hoesch, who would shoot Drakulas interiors, though the film's credits suggest he was one of two cinematographers who worked on the film. The other was Lajos Gasser.  No surviving records suggest the names of other crew members on the film.  Among the cast was Paul Askonas as Drakula. Askonas was a member of the Deutsches Volstheatre in Vienna and had previously acted as Svengali in Trilby (1912), and later appear in films like Hoffmanns Erzählungen (1923) and The Hands of Orlac (1924). Other larger roles in the film included Dezső Kertész who was Mihály's brother,  as the young male lead George, and Margit Lux as Mary Land. Lux's role in the film was described by film historian Gary Don Rhodes as "a matter of minor controversy" as the  January 1921 issue of Képes Mozivilág stated Lene Myl would play "the role of the heroine." Rhodes found that several publication between 1921 and 1923 stated that Lux played Mary Land, opposed to Myl and stated that "it is definitely Lux who appears with Askonas in a Drakula halála publicity still published in Szinház és Mozi in 1921; its caption specifically credits Lux as portraying Mary." Rhodes went on to note other errors Képes Mozivilág had reported, such as that H.G. Wells had written the novel Dracula.

In December 1920, Lajthay shot some of the film's exteriors in and near Vienna, such as in the village of Melk. Beginning on January 2, 1921, he shot interior scenes at Corvin Film Studio in Budapest and returned to Vienna to shoot additional exteriors in the Wachau valley. During production, the film's title changed to Drakula halála.

Release

Rhodes stated that Drakula halála allegedly premiered in Vienna in February 1921, though no information has yet surfaced in Austrian trade publications or Vienna newspapers. According to a "Calendar of Events" listing in the April 1923 issue of Mozi és Film – distributor Jenö Tuchten presented Drakula halála in Hungary for the first time on 14 April 1923. Rhodes found no evidence of the film being re-released in either Hungary or Austria and it appears to have vanished from distribution in early 1923.

Since its release, four publicity photographs of the film surfaced in Hungary. Two feature Lene Myl, and the other two are of Askonas as Drakula. The only other item that survives of the feature is a short novella that is reportedly written by Lajos Pánczél, which Rhodes described as a "book-of-the-film".

See also
 Michael Curtiz filmography
 List of lost films

References

Sources

External links

Austrian silent feature films
Dracula films
Austrian black-and-white films
1920s lost films
Films shot in Vienna